Benjamin Oliver James (June 4, 1852 – April 26, 1927) was an American Democratic politician who served as a member of the Virginia House of Delegates and as Secretary of the Commonwealth of Virginia under 6 governors.

References

External links 

1850s births
1920s deaths
Secretaries of the Commonwealth of Virginia
Democratic Party members of the Virginia House of Delegates
20th-century American politicians